Wilbur Roy Jackett,  (June 27, 1912 – September 10, 2005) was a Canadian scholar, public servant, jurist, and the first chief justice of the Federal Court of Canada.

Born in Tompkins, Saskatchewan, Jackett moved with his family to Kamsack, Saskatchewan in 1920 at the age of eight.  After graduating from high school in Kamsack, Jackett graduated with degrees in both Arts and Laws from the University of Saskatchewan. In 1933 he was elected a Rhodes Scholar and went to study at the University of Oxford. He was called to the Bar of Saskatchewan.

From 1957 to 1960, he was the Eighth Deputy Minister of the Department of Justice. In 1960 he became general counsel for the Canadian Pacific Railway. He was later appointed president of the Exchequer Court of Canada. He was the First Chief Justice of the Federal Court of Canada from 1971 until 1979.

On 9 May 1958, he was awarded an honorary DCL from the University of Saskatchewan. In 1981, he was made an Officer of the Order of Canada.

References 

 

1912 births
2005 deaths
20th-century Canadian civil servants
Canadian Rhodes Scholars
Officers of the Order of Canada
Judges in Saskatchewan
Lawyers in Saskatchewan
Canadian King's Counsel
University of Saskatchewan alumni
People from Kamsack, Saskatchewan
University of Saskatchewan College of Law alumni
Judges of the Exchequer Court of Canada
Judges of the Federal Court of Canada